Mike Listo is an American television director and co-executive producer.

Selected director filmography
Boston Legal (TV series)
Monk (TV series) 
Boston Public (TV series)
Harry's Law (TV series)
Memphis Beat (TV series)
90210 (TV series)
Mercy (TV series)
Golden Boy (TV series)
Monday Mornings (TV series)
Franklin & Bash (TV series)
The Mysteries of Laura (TV series)
Satisfaction (TV series)
How to Get Away with Murder (TV series)
The Catch (TV series)
Nashville (TV series)
Notorious (TV series)
Designated Survivor (TV series)
The Good Doctor (TV series)

Executive producer
Boston Legal (TV series)
The Good Doctor (TV series)

Co-executive producer
Ally McBeal (TV series)
Boston Public (TV series) 
Boston Legal (TV series)
Harry's Law (TV series)

Awards and nominations

References

External links
 

American television directors
American television producers
Living people
Primetime Emmy Award winners
Place of birth missing (living people)
Year of birth missing (living people)